Brian Edward Baker (born July 16, 1967) is an American actor best known for his recurring role as a trenchcoated spokesman in Sprint's television commercials.

Biography

Early career
Baker began his acting career at the age of 11 as a member of a now-defunct community film enthusiast club known as Cinekyd, based in Willow Grove, Pennsylvania, where youngsters acted in, directed, edited, and produced amateur movies under adult supervision.  In Chicago, Illinois, following college, he studied at The Second City improvisational comedy troupe, while also working as a stand-up comedian and in the Seanachai Theatre Company. To make ends meet he waited tables at John's Place in Chicago's Lincoln Park neighborhood.

Sprint
Baker moved to Los Angeles, California in 1999, and within six weeks, had landed the role that would be his big break—The Sprint Guy. Although originally contracted to appear in only five ads, the overwhelming popularity of the commercials led to Baker's appearance in 155 spots over six years. In 2001, People named him in their "50 Most Beautiful People" list, dubbing him "Sexiest Pitchman". Soon Baker's image appeared all over Sprint's in-store signage, printed material, and even the company's website, providing a human face for an otherwise faceless telecommunications behemoth. The 2005 merger of Sprint and rival Nextel spelled the end of the commercials when the company implemented a "new look" campaign, and marketing for the new company was handed over to Nextel's ad agency.

Television work
In addition to his work in commercials, Baker appeared on the short-lived NBC series M.Y.O.B.. He appears as Representative John Tandy on the television series The West Wing and guest-starred on episodes of Providence, The Drew Carey Show, and V.I.P.

Personal life
Baker lives in Hershey, Pennsylvania, and Chicago, Illinois. He was married to actress Terry Farrell of Star Trek: Deep Space Nine and Becker. The couple divorced in 2015. They have one child. 

Baker is a 1985 graduate of  William Tennent High School in Warminster, Pennsylvania. He earned a Bachelor of Arts in marketing from Penn State University in 1990.

While at Penn State, Baker became a member of Phi Kappa Theta.

He is currently in a long-term relationship with the violinist-composer Susan Voelz.

References

External links
 
 "Sprint's Trench Coat Guy Loses His Connection, but He's Waiting for a Redial" The Washington Post, October 3, 2005

American male stage actors
American male television actors
Sprint Corporation people
Smeal College of Business alumni
Male actors from Philadelphia
People from Hershey, Pennsylvania
1967 births
Living people
People from Bucks County, Pennsylvania
Spokespersons